Kolkata Chalantika is a 2022 Indian Bengali-language emotional drama film directed and written by Pavel. The film stars an ensemble cast and is based on the 2016 Kolkata flyover collapse.

Plot
Based on the 2016 Kolkata flyover collapse, the film relates the lives of many people from the city Kolkata, and shows how the unfortunate incident affects them and brings about a change in their lifestyle.

Cast
Saurav Das as Baichung 
Ishaa Saha as Tumpa 
Aparajita Auddy as Constable Debi
Satabdi Chakraborty as Rimi 
Ditipriya Roy as Ador 
Kharaj Mukherjee as Banka Da
Anirban Chakrabarti as Shibaji
Kiran Dutta as Aabesh
Rajatava Dutta
Anamika Saha
Pavel

Soundtrack

Release

References

2022 films
Bengali-language Indian films
Indian historical drama films
Films set in Kolkata
Films directed by Pavel